Vitor Hugo do Espirito Santo Costa (born 22 October 1998), commonly known as Pinguim or Vitor Hugo, is a Brazilian footballer who currently plays as a forward for Villa Nova.

Career statistics

Club

Notes

References

1998 births
Living people
Brazilian footballers
Association football forwards
Villa Nova Atlético Clube players